Friedland was an  118-gun ship of the line of the French Navy.

Career 

Her keel was laid down in Cherbourg in 1812 as Inflexibe. During her construction, she was renamed Friedland, Duc de Bordeaux during the Bourbon Restoration, Friedland again briefly during the Hundred Days and back to Duc de Bordeaux thereafter. On 9 October 1830, following the July Revolution, she took her name of Friedland. She was finally launched on 4 March 1840.

She was decommissioned from 1852 to 1853, when she took back service and served in the Crimean war. On 27 July 1853, she ran aground off the Rabbit Islands, Ottoman Empire. She was later refloated.

From March 1865, she was used as barracks hulk in Toulon, as Colosse.

Sources and references

References

Bibliography 

  Le Friedland, son nom, son lancement (1840)

Ships of the line of the French Navy
Océan-class ships of the line
Ships built in France
1840 ships
Victorian-era ships of the line
Maritime incidents in July 1853